This is a list of museums in Mauritania.

List 
 National Museum of Mauritania
 Musée de Medicine Traditionnelle de Mauritanie
 Museum of Ouadane

See also 
 List of museums by country

External links 
 Museums in Mauritania

 
Mauritania
Museums
Museums
Mauritania